is a town located on Dōgo, in Oki District, Shimane Prefecture, Japan. As of June 2013, the town had an estimated population of 14,849 and a population density of 61.1 persons per km2. The total area was 242.95 km2.

Etymology 
Okinoshima Town takes its name from Okinoshima, the traditional name for all four inhabited Oki Islands. There is no single island named Okinoshima.

History
Okinoshima Town was formed from the merger of the town of Saigō, and the villages of Fuse, Goka and Tsuma on October 1, 2004, all from Oki District.

Geography
Okinoshima occupies all of the island of Dōgo, in the Oki Islands archipelago in the Sea of Japan, along with numerous offshore uninhabited islands and rocks. For administrative purposes, the Japanese government officially considers the disputed islet of Takeshima (Liancourt Rocks) to be a part of the town of Okinoshima.

Climate 
Okinoshima has a humid subtropical climate (Köppen climate classification Cfa) with very warm summers and cool winters. Precipitation is abundant throughout the year.

Demographics
Per Japanese census data, the population of Okinoshima in 2020 is 13,433 people. Okinoshima has been conducting censuses since 1920.

Economy
The town economy is primarily based on agriculture and commercial fishing.

Transportation

Airport
Oki Airport (OKI), a Class III facility with a 1991 m runway, is located within the town. It provides air service to Osaka International Airport ("Itami") and Izumo Airport.

Highway
Japan National Route 485

Sea Port
Saigō Port is the major seaport and ferry terminal in the Oki Islands

Local attractions
 A set of two station bells designated as Important Cultural Property of Japan is located at the ( in Okinoshima.

Notable people from Okinoshima
 Okinoumi Ayumi – sumo wrestler, the first wrestler from Shimane Prefecture to reach the top makuuchi division in 88 years
Kai Hirano – professional soccer player

References

External links
 
  

Towns in Shimane Prefecture
Port settlements in Japan
Populated coastal places in Japan